Iena may refer to:

 Jena, city in Germany (French: Iéna, Greek: Ιένα, Latin: Iena)
 Pont d'Iéna, a Parisian bridge spanning the River Seine
 French ship Iéna, various ships
 Iéna (Paris Métro), a Paris Métro station
 Palais d'Iéna, see list of monuments historiques in Paris
 IENA (car), a former Italian automobile
 I.E.N.A., album of the Italian rapper Clementino